Stadio Rigamonti-Ceppi is a multi-use stadium in Lecco, Italy. It is currently used mostly for football matches and is the home ground of Calcio Lecco 1912. The stadium holds 4,997 people.

History
The stadium was named after Mario Rigamonti who died in the Superga air disaster, and Mario Ceppi, a former president of Calcio Lecco 1912.

On August 9, 2014, the stadium hosted the finals of the WFDF World Ultimate Club Championships, an ultimate frisbee event.

References

Rigamonti
Rigamonti-Ceppi
Calcio Lecco 1912
Sports venues in Lombardy